Eric Fryer may refer to:

 Eric Fryer (actor), Canadian actor
 Eric Fryer (baseball) (born 1985), American baseball catcher